

This is a list of the National Register of Historic Places listings in Berkshire County, Massachusetts.

This is intended to be a complete list of the properties and districts on the National Register of Historic Places in Berkshire County, Massachusetts, United States. Latitude and longitude coordinates are provided for many National Register properties and districts; these locations may be seen together in a map.

There are 178 properties and districts listed on the National Register in the county, including 10 National Historic Landmarks.

Current listings

|}

See also
 
 List of National Historic Landmarks in Massachusetts
 National Register of Historic Places listings in Massachusetts

References

.
.
Berkshire County